The 2008–09 season of the División de Plata is the 16th season of second-tier futsal in Spain.

Regular season

League table - Group Norte

League table - Group Sur

Playoffs for promotion

Group A
Scores and Standings

UMA Antequera, Sala 10 Zaragoza and ElPozo Ciudad de Murcia begins respectively with 3, 2 and 1 point(s) added.

Group B
Scores and Standings

Arcebansa Zamora, M.M. Pérez Bujalance and Burela Pescados Rubén begins respectively with 3, 2 and 1 point(s) added.

Top goal scorers
,

References

External links
2008–09 season at lnfs.es

See also
2008–09 División de Honor de Futsal
División de Honor de Futsal
Futsal in Spain

2008 09
2008–09 in Spanish futsal
futsal2